Pedro Tonon Geromel (born 21 September 1985) is a Brazilian professional footballer who plays as a centre-back and is captain for Grêmio. Geromel also holds an Italian passport because of his grandfather.

Club career

Early years
Born in São Paulo, Geromel moved to Portugal from Sociedade Esportiva Palmeiras along with Elias. He signed with G.D. Chaves at only 18 and finished his footballing formation there, after which he made his professional debut in the 2004–05 season, with the northern team in the second division.

Vitória Guimarães
Geromel's performances there attracted the attention of Primeira Liga club Vitória SC. At Guimarães, after making his debut in a 2–0 derby home loss against S.C. Braga, he eventually became an undisputed first-choice, as the Minho side promoted from the second level and achieved qualification to the UEFA Champions League in just two seasons.

1. FC Köln
In an online voting, Geromel was considered as 2007–08's best player in the Portuguese League, beating FC Porto's Lisandro López and Lucho González. On 30 June 2008, he moved to Bundesliga club 1. FC Köln, recently promoted to the top division.

An undisputed first-choice from the beginning, Geromel impressed enough during his first two years in Germany, reportedly being courted by Real Madrid from La Liga. Eventually, nothing came of it.

On 23 August 2012, Geromel signed a four-year loan deal with RCD Mallorca in Spain. In his first season he contributed with 29 starts and one goal (2,612 minutes of action), but the Balearic Islands team were relegated from the top flight; in December 2013 he rescinded his agreement and returned to his country, to sign for two years and a half with Grêmio Foot-Ball Porto Alegrense while still owned by Köln.

International career
On 27 August 2016, Geromel was called up for the Brazil national team by coach Tite, replacing the injured Rodrigo Caio. His first cap arrived the following 25 January, when he played the full 90 minutes in a 1–0 friendly win over Colombia at the Estádio Olímpico Nilton Santos.

In May 2018, Geromel was selected for that year's FIFA World Cup in Russia.

Career statistics

Club

International

Honours
Grêmio
Copa do Brasil: 2016
Campeonato Gaúcho: 2018, 2019, 2020, 2021, 2022
Copa Libertadores: 2017
Recopa Sudamericana: 2018
Recopa Gaúcha: 2019, 2021, 2022

Individual
 Bola de Prata: 2015, 2016, 2017, 2018
 Campeonato Brasileiro Série A Team of the Year: 2016, 2017, 2018
 Grêmio Hall of Fame: 2019

References

External links

1985 births
Living people
Footballers from São Paulo
Brazilian footballers
Italian footballers
Citizens of Italy through descent
Brazilian people of Italian descent
Association football defenders
Campeonato Brasileiro Série A players
Campeonato Brasileiro Série B players
Sociedade Esportiva Palmeiras players
Grêmio Foot-Ball Porto Alegrense players
Primeira Liga players
Liga Portugal 2 players
G.D. Chaves players
Vitória S.C. players
Bundesliga players
1. FC Köln players
La Liga players
Segunda División players
RCD Mallorca players
Copa Libertadores-winning players
Brazil international footballers
2018 FIFA World Cup players
Brazilian expatriate footballers
Italian expatriate footballers
Expatriate footballers in Portugal
Expatriate footballers in Germany
Expatriate footballers in Spain
Brazilian expatriate sportspeople in Portugal
Brazilian expatriate sportspeople in Germany
Brazilian expatriate sportspeople in Spain
Italian expatriate sportspeople in Portugal
Italian expatriate sportspeople in Germany
Italian expatriate sportspeople in Spain